Hamza Çakır (born 30 September 1985) is a German former footballer. He played in the 2. Bundesliga for Fortuna Düsseldorf and in the Süper Lig for Kayserispor and Karabükspor.

Career
Çakır began playing football with the youth side of Fortuna Düsseldorf. He signed a professional contract with the club in 2004, and would captain the side to promotion from the 3. Liga during the 2008–09 season. Due to injury, he would only play nine league matches during the following season, and could not agree to terms on a new contract. At age 24, after 10 years with Fortuna, Çakır moved to Turkey to play for Kayserispor; after two years he moved back to Düsseldorf. He retired from professional football in 2014.

Statistics

Statistics accurate as of last match played on 20 August 2010.

Personal life 
Çakır is of Turkish descent. He is married and has a son. After his retirement from football, he founded a Turkish café in Cologne with his family.

References

External links
 
 

1985 births
Living people
German footballers
Fortuna Düsseldorf players
Kayserispor footballers
Süper Lig players
2. Bundesliga players
3. Liga players
German people of Turkish descent
Association football defenders
Footballers from Cologne